Nack or variation, may refer to:

Places
 Nack, a municipality in Alzey-Worms, Rhineland-Palatinate, Germany

People
 Agathe Ngo Nack (born 1958), Cameroonian athlete
 Jaime Nack (born 1976), U.S. environmental consultant
 James M. Nack (1809–1879), U.S. poet
 Katie Nack, mayor of Pasadena, California, USA
 Michel Nack Balokog (born 1986), Cameroonian soccer player
 Milo De Nack, bassist for the band Medusa (band)
 William Nack (1941–2018), U.S. journalist

Characters
 Näck, a water spirit in Swedish mythology
 Nack the Weasel, a fictional character from Sonic the Hedgehog
 Nick Nack, henchman to Bond villain Francisco Scaramanga in the film The Man with the Golden Gun (film)

Other uses
 NACK, acknowledgement in telecom

See also

 FM Nack5, a radio station in Saitama, Japan
 NACK5 Stadium Omiya, Ōmiya-ku, Saitama City, Saitama Prefecture, Japan; a soccer stadium
 Nick Nack (disambiguation)
 
 Nach (disambiguation)
 Nakh (disambiguation)
 NAC (disambiguation)
 Nak (disambiguation)
 Naq (disambiguation)
 Knack (disambiguation)